This article lists players who have captained the Galway county hurling team in the All-Ireland Senior Hurling Championship. Unlike other counties the captain is not chosen from the club that has won the Galway Senior Hurling Championship.

List of captains

2010-present

References

Hurling
+Captains
Galway